Park Heejun is a South Korean senior male karateka.

The 24-year-old became the first South Korean to win an Asian Games medal in kata, a non-sparring event in which practitioners demonstrate the Japanese martial art’s patterns and movements.
Since karate became an Asiad medal sport, South Korea has won eight bronze medals over the last six Asian Games, all in kumite, a sparring discipline.
He placed third in the Karate1 Premier League's 2014 Jakarta tournament.

References 

Living people
South Korean male karateka
Asian Games medalists in karate
Asian Games bronze medalists for South Korea
Karateka at the 2018 Asian Games
Medalists at the 2018 Asian Games
Karateka at the 2020 Summer Olympics
1994 births
21st-century South Korean people